Nest Egg may refer to:

 NestEgg, a brand of chocolate candy by Nestle
 Operation Nest Egg, a biodiversity program to protect kiwi populations
 Operation Nestegg, a 1944 codename for Task Force 135 in the Channel Islands' liberation from Germany